Marco Fritz (born 3 October 1977) is a German football referee who is based in Korb. He referees for SV Breuningsweiler of the Württemberg Football Association. He is a FIFA referee, and is ranked as a UEFA second category referee.

Refereeing career
At age six Fritz became a member of SV Breuningsweiler, for whom he has been a referee for since 1997. He officiated in the Landesverband Württemberg, and in 2006 he became a DFB referee. He first officiated in the 2. Bundesliga in the 2008–09 season. Throughout the season he awarded 34 yellow cards and one red card. Fritz was then promoted to officiate in the Bundesliga the following season. His first Bundesliga match was between SC Freiburg and Bayer Leverkusen.

In 2012 Fritz was put on the FIFA referees list along with Felix Zwayer. Babak Rafati and Peter Sippel were in turn taken off the list. His first international tournament was the 2012 UEFA European Under-19 Championship elite qualification. His international officiating debut was on 23 May 2012 in the match between Greece and Turkey.

Together with his assistants Dominik Schaal and Marcel Pelgrim, Fritz was chosen as the referee for the 2016 DFB-Pokal Final, which took place on 21 May 2016 in the Olympiastadion in Berlin between Bayern Munich and Borussia Dortmund.

Personal life
Fritz is a banker and lives in Korb. His hobbies include sports and music.

See also
List of football referees

References

External links
 Profile at dfb.de 
 Profile at worldfootball.net

1977 births
Living people
People from Rems-Murr-Kreis
Sportspeople from Stuttgart (region)
German football referees
UEFA Europa League referees